The 2002 Prague municipal election was held as part of 2002 Czech municipal elections. It was held on 1 and 2 November 2002. Civic Democratic Party has won the election and Pavel Bém became the Mayor of Prague.

Background
Civic Democratic Party (ODS) won 1998 municipal election in Prague and Jan Kasl became the mayor. He resigned on the position in May 2002 after conflicts with his colleagues in the party. He left ODS and formed new party called European Democrats. Igor Němec replaced Kasl as the Mayor of Prague.

Campaign
Pavel Bém became Civic Democratic Party candidate for Mayor. Czech Social Democratic Party (ČSSD) was led by Jiří Paroubek. Freedom Union was led by Michael Hvížďala. European Democrats were led by Jan Kasl.

Campaign started in October 2002. Parties filled the city with billboards. ODS focused on safety. Freedom Union promised easily available housing. ČSSD promised "City for Living." Leader of ČSSD Paroubek held many meeting with voters to be as visible as possible.

Results

Civic Democrats led by Pavel bém won the election. Bém then formed coalition with Czech Social Democratic Party and became the Mayor of Prague.

References

2002
Prague municipal election
Municipal election, 2002